Timothy Bradley vs. Juan Manuel Márquez, was a boxing welterweight championship fight. The bout was held on October 12, 2013, at the Thomas & Mack Center in  Las Vegas, Nevada, United States on HBO Pay-Per-View. Vasiliy Lomachenko made his professional debut on the undercard.

Bradley won via a split decision.
The judges scored the fight 113–115, 115–113, 116–112.

Fight Card

International broadcasting

1The GMA News TV version ceased airing due to high airtime cost with live coverage via satellite feed of Timothy Bradley vs. Juan Manuel Marquez boxing fight.

References

External links

Top Rank
Timothy Bradley vs. Juan Manuel Marquez on HBO

Boxing matches
2013 in boxing
Boxing in Las Vegas
2013 in sports in Nevada
October 2013 sports events in the United States